Västerort (sometimes translated to West Stockholm)  is the western part of  Stockholm Municipality in Stockholm County, Sweden. It also forms part of Stockholm urban area and of Stockholm Metropolitan Area. It constitutes the western suburban area within Stockholm's municipal borders.

The eastern part of Västerort was incorporated by the City of Stockholm in 1916 and the western part in 1949.

Since 2007, Västerort is organized into four stadsdelsområden (sometimes translated to boroughs): Bromma, Hässelby-Vällingby, Rinkeby-Kista, and Spånga-Tensta.

Before 2007, it was organized into five boroughs: Bromma borough, Hässelby-Vällingby borough, Kista borough, Rinkeby borough and Spånga-Tensta borough.

Districts

1/ hectares2/ Population per hectare

See also
Stockholm City Centre
Söderort

References

 
Suburbs in Europe